George Leary (born 19 November 1957) is a Canadian sports shooter. He competed at the 1988 Summer Olympics, 1992, 1996 and the 2000 Summer Olympics.

References

External links
 

1957 births
Living people
Canadian male sport shooters
Olympic shooters of Canada
Shooters at the 1988 Summer Olympics
Shooters at the 1992 Summer Olympics
Shooters at the 1996 Summer Olympics
Shooters at the 2000 Summer Olympics
Sportspeople from Newmarket, Ontario
Commonwealth Games medallists in shooting
Commonwealth Games silver medallists for Canada
Pan American Games medalists in shooting
Pan American Games gold medalists for Canada
Pan American Games silver medalists for Canada
Pan American Games bronze medalists for Canada
Shooters at the 1979 Pan American Games
Shooters at the 1991 Pan American Games
Shooters at the 1995 Pan American Games
Shooters at the 1999 Pan American Games
Medalists at the 1991 Pan American Games
Medalists at the 1999 Pan American Games
Shooters at the 1978 Commonwealth Games
Shooters at the 1994 Commonwealth Games
20th-century Canadian people
Medallists at the 1978 Commonwealth Games
Medallists at the 1994 Commonwealth Games